Malesia (also Struga Malesia) is a small region in the Upper Struga Municipality, in western North Macedonia, at the Golema River. It is inhabited by Orthodox Christians, as opposed to the settlements to the south, which are Muslim. Burinec and Selce used to be part of the Debar župa. The Karaorman Mountain is situated to the east of Ržanovo. The toponym Malesija is of Albanian origin from the word Malësi meaning a mountainous area or region. During the period between 1960-1975, many inhabitants of Malesia migrated to Struga. In a 1903 document by the Cartographic Society of Sofia, the villages of Malesia were all registered with Albanian Orthodox majorities, but nowadays they have assimilated and identify as Macedonians.

It contains these villages:

Prisovjani (Присовјани)
Brčevo (Брчево)
Ržanovo (Ржаново)
Globočica (Глобочица)
Zbaždi (Збажди)
Lokov (Локов)
Selci (Селци)
Burinec (Буринец)

See also
Malesia, Albania

References

Sources
Branislav Rusić, Malesija

Struga Municipality
Albanian ethnographic regions
Albanian communities in North Macedonia